Elissa A. Hallem is an American neurobiologist. She won a 2012 MacArthur Fellowship.

Life
Elissa Hallem was born in Santa Monica, California in 1977. In 8th grade she enrolled in a summer program run by the Johns Hopkins University Center for Talented Youth where she followed a course in psychology held at the Loyola Marymount University at Los Angeles. During high school, she worked in a UCLA lab with professor S. Lawrence Zipursky, a family friend. She graduated from Williams College with a B.A. in biology and chemistry in 1999, and received a Ph.D. from Yale University in 2005.

References

External links
Yale.edu

Living people
MacArthur Fellows
Yale University alumni
Williams College alumni
Year of birth missing (living people)